Brauch is a surname. Notable people with this surname include:

 Kevin Brauch (born 1968), Canadian television presenter
 Liane Russell (1923–2019), American geneticist and conservationist
 Tim Brauch (1974–1999), American skateboarder
 Ursula Brauch (born 1962), German rower
 David Brauch  (born 1955), American musician